Poor Knights names various groups:

 The Poor Knights of Christ and the Temple of Solomon, or Knights Templar, a major Catholic military order, 1129–1312
 The Poor Knights of Windsor, or Military Knights of Windsor, military pensioners in the UK, ~1346–present
 The Poor Knights of Christ, Militia Templi, a Catholic lay order founded in 1979

It may also refer to:

 French toast, sometimes just "poor knights", sometimes "poor knights of Windsor"
 Poor Knights Islands, New Zealand
 The Poor Knights Lily, Xeronema callistemon
 Poor Knights Islands Marine Reserve
 "The Poor Knights of Acre", song by The Templars (band)